The following page lists the largest reservoirs by volume in England and Wales.

References

Reservoirs in the United Kingdom